Amendment 2 was a ballot measure approved by Colorado voters on November 3, 1992, simultaneously with the United States presidential election. The amendment prevented municipalities from enacting anti-discrimination laws protecting gay, lesbian, or bisexual people. 

The amendment's enactment prompted a widespread boycott. It was declared unconstitutional by the Supreme Court of the United States in Romer v. Evans (1996).

Contents 
The proposal appeared on the ballot as follows:

Campaign
Several major cities in Colorado enacted laws prohibiting anti-gay discrimination, including Aspen in 1977, Boulder in 1987, and Denver in 1991. Literature from Colorado for Family Values (CFV), a conservative group based in Colorado Springs, presented municipal anti-discrimination laws as the first steps towards a "national 'gay-rights' law."

In March 1992, CFV submitted the required signatures for a ballot initiative. Their amendment would add the following passage to the state Constitution:

The text of the amendment focuses on the issue of "special rights" being given to homosexuals; this contrasts with the actual municipal ordinances at issue, which only protected homosexuals from discrimination. A focus group paid for by Equal Protection Ordinance Colorado found that while Coloradans didn't agree with anti-gay discrimination, they disliked anything related to affirmative action.

The amendment was opposed by the ACLU, the League of Women Voters, Governor Roy Romer, Senate candidate Ben Nighthorse Campbell and Representative Pat Schroeder.

Results
A poll taken by Talmey-Drake shortly before the election indicated that Amendment 2 would fail, with 42% voting for it and 52% voting against. On Election Day, however, Amendment 2 was approved with a margin of almost 7 points.

Results by county
{| class="wikitable sortable"
|-
! rowspan=2 | County 
! colspan=2 | Yes
! colspan=2 | No
! rowspan=2 | Invalid votes
|-
! Votes
! %
! Votes
! %
|-
|Adams
|55,400
|54.36%
|46,520
|45.64%
|3,140
|-
|Alamosa
|2,666
|59.38%
|1,824
|40.62%
|1,060
|-
|Arapahoe
|98,498
|54.79%
|81,290
|45.21%
|6,005
|-
|Archuleta
|1,430
|53.66%
|1,235
|46.34%
|194
|-
|Baca
|1,963
|79.03%
|521
|20.97%
|168
|-
|Bent
|1,579
|71.64%
|625
|28.36%
|113
|-
|Boulder
|48,704
|38.61%
|77,432
|61.39%
|4,722
|-
|Chaffee
|3,922
|64.30%
|2,178
|35.70%
|277
|-
|Cheyenne
|802
|69.32%
|355
|30.68%
|71
|-
|Clear Creek
|2,046
|46.49%
|2,355
|53.51%
|102
|-
|Conejos
|1,833
|56.71%
|1,399
|43.29%
|430
|-
|Costilla
|628
|48.27%
|673
|51.73%
|508
|-
|Crowley
|894
|65.11%
|479
|34.89%
|107
|-
|Custer
|897
|65.86%
|465
|34.14%
|53
|-
|Delta
|5,985
|58.65%
|4,220
|41.35%
|565
|-
|Denver
|82,030
|40.22%
|121,919
|59.78%
|16,704
|-
|Dolores
|509
|66.02%
|262
|33.98%
|89
|-
|Douglas
|23,750
|59.71%
|16,024
|40.29%
|700
|-
|Eagle
|4,087
|38.53%
|6,520
|61.47%
|403
|-
|Elbert
|3,499
|67.28%
|1,702
|32.72%
|167
|-
|El Paso
|105,518
|65.88%
|54,653
|34.12%
|9,538
|-
|Fremont
|9,865
|66.85%
|4,893
|33.15%
|534
|-
|Garfield
|6,651
|48.29%
|7,122
|51.71%
|334
|-
|Gilpin
|752
|43.09%
|993
|56.91%
|27
|-
|Grand
|2,519
|51.78%
|2,346
|48.22%
|115
|-
|Gunnison
|2,442
|43.34%
|3,193
|56.66%
|182
|-
|Hinsdale
|219
|47.20%
|245
|52.80%
|19
|-
|Huerfano
|1,616
|58.64%
|1,140
|41.36%
|349
|-
|Jackson
|568
|61.01%
|363
|38.99%
|42
|-
|Jefferson
|119,970
|55.06%
|97,927
|44.94%
|8,033
|-
|Kiowa
|811
|80.78%
|193
|19.22%
|40
|-
|Kit Carson
|2,240
|65.12%
|1,200
|34.88%
|258
|-
|Lake
|1,454
|50.93%
|1,401
|49.07%
|110
|-
|La Plata
|7,001
|46.14%
|8,173
|53.86%
|848
|-
|Larimer
|52,973
|53.81%
|45,464
|46.19%
|2,281
|-
|Las Animas
|4,601
|73.80%
|1,633
|26.20%
|540
|-
|Lincoln
|1,618
|72.36%
|618
|27.64%
|90
|-
|Logan
|5,047|61.73%|3,129
|38.27%
|374
|-
|Mesa
|24,214|55.65%|19,301
|44.35%
|1,539
|-
|Mineral
|227|52.30%|207
|47.70%
|21
|-
|Moffatt
|2,865|57.60%|2,109
|42.40%
|211
|-
|Montezuma
|4,339|58.59%|3,067
|41.41%
|393
|-
|Montrose
|7,107|62.21%|4,318
|37.79%
|532
|-
|Morgan
|5,324|63.59%|3,048
|36.41%
|646
|-
|Otero
|4,903|64.97%|2,643
|35.03%
|980
|-
|Ouray
|783|51.08%|750
|48.92%
|69
|-
|Park
|2,323|55.36%|1,873
|44.64%
|146
|-
|Phillips
|1,498|68.25%|697
|31.75%
|139
|-
|Pitkin
|2,026
|28.09%
|5,187|71.91%|330
|-
|Prowers
|3,858|75.97%|1,220
|24.03%
|487
|-
|Pueblo
|33,032|59.63%|22,360
|40.37%
|3,017
|-
|Rio Blanco
|1,689|60.93%|1,083
|39.07%
|95
|-
|Rio Grande
|2,940|66.65%|1,471
|33.35%
|254
|-
|Routt
|3,997
|49.86%
|4,019|50.14%|222
|-
|Saguache
|1,070|52.71%|960
|47.29%
|218
|-
|San Juan
|206
|46.82%
|234|53.18%|20
|-
|San Miguel
|855
|33.86%
|1,670|66.14%|156
|-
|Sedgwick
|638|58.96%|444
|41.04%
|451
|-
|Summit
|3,278
|39.84%
|4,950|60.16%|191
|-
|Teller
|4,163|60.95%|2,667
|39.05%
|203
|-
|Washington
|1,788|71.09%|727
|28.91%
|136
|-
|Weld
|30,830|59.31%|21,148
|40.69%
|3,063
|-
|Yuma
|3,026|69.72%'|1,314
|30.28%
|218
|-
!Totals
!813,966
!53.41%
!710,151
!46.59%
!73,049
|}

Aftermath

Following the vote, there were calls among liberals to boycott Colorado. A large part of the boycott was centered around tourism, a major industry in the state; many national organizations cancelled conventions that were planned to be held in Colorado and several city government banned official travel to the state. 

Some Hollywood productions moved away from Colorado, including Laurel Entertainment's The Stand miniseries. The boycott also prompted the creators of the in-production series Frasier'' to change the setting from Denver to Seattle. 

The tourism industry lost about $40 million as a result of the boycott. A more drastic effect could be seen in film production, where revenue fell from about $28 million a year to $15 million.

The amendment was challenged in court by Denver municipal employee Richard G. Evans. On January 15, several hours before the amendment was scheduled to be signed into law, Denver District Court judge Jeff Bayless issued a temporary restraining order, giving himself a few more hours to review the case. Later that day, he issued a permanent injunction against the amendment. The state supreme court would find it unconstitutional in 1994, a position affirmed by the United States Supreme Court in 1996. Boycott Colorado, the main organization supporting the boycott, rescinded the call following the state supreme court's ruling.

References

Further reading
 

1992 Colorado ballot measures